The Center for the Defense of Free Enterprise (CDFE) is a wise use think tank which describes itself as "an educational foundation for individual liberty, free markets, property rights and limited government".

CDFE was founded in 1974 by Alan Gottlieb. Its Executive Vice-President is Ron Arnold

References

External links 
 cdfe.org – official homepage
 Organizational Profile – National Center for Charitable Statistics (Urban Institute)

Legal advocacy organizations in the United States
Libertarian organizations based in the United States
Libertarian think tanks
Political and economic think tanks in the United States
Organizations established in 1974